The men's 600 metre free rifle prone was a shooting sports event held as part of the Shooting at the 1924 Summer Olympics programme. It was the only appearance of the event. The competition was held on 27 June 1924 at the shooting ranges at Camp de Châlons, Mourmelon. 73 shooters from 19 nations competed.

Results
A maximum of four competitors per nation were allowed. Morris Fisher and Carl Osburn both set a new Olympic record with 95 rings.

References

External links
 Official Report
 

Shooting at the 1924 Summer Olympics
Men's 600m